Mark Francis Cohen (born 27 March 1961) is a former Irish cricketer. A right-handed batsman and right-arm medium pace bowler, he made his debut for Ireland against Wales in July 1980 and went on to play for Ireland on 69 occasions, his last match coming against Canada in the 1994 ICC Trophy.

Of his 69 matches for Ireland, ten had first-class status, all of which were against Scotland and six had List A status, all of which were NatWest Trophy first round matches.

He scored two centuries for Ireland, the best being 118 in a two-day match against Sussex in July 1987. He bowled just once for Ireland, a maiden over against Scotland in June 1993.

References

1961 births
Living people
Irish cricketers

Sportspeople from Cork (city)